Australaves is a recently defined clade of birds, consisting of the Eufalconimorphae (passerines, parrots and falcons) as well as the Cariamiformes (including seriemas and the extinct "terror birds"). They appear to be the sister group of Afroaves.  As in the case of Afroaves, the most basal clades have predatory extant members, suggesting this was the ancestral lifestyle; however, some researchers like Darren Naish are skeptical of this assessment, since some extinct representatives such as the herbivorous Strigogyps led other lifestyles. Basal parrots and falcons are at any rate vaguely crow-like and probably omnivorous.

 

Cladogram of Telluraves relationships based on Kuhl et al. (2020) and Braun & Kimball (2021)

References

Neognathae